Dasht Mal (also Romanized as Dasht Māl) is a village in Pian Rural District, in the Central District of Izeh County, Khuzestan Province, Iran. At the 2006 census, its population was 26, in 4 families.

References 

Populated places in Izeh County